Eight of Cups is a card used in Latin suited playing cards which include tarot decks. It is part of what tarot card readers call the "Minor Arcana"
Tarot cards are used throughout much of Europe to play Tarot card games.

In English-speaking countries, where the games are largely unknown, Tarot cards came to be utilized primarily for divinatory purposes.

This indicates changes in affections and the breaking of irrelevant links with the past - a turning away from existing relationships and objects of affection with the intent of progressing to that which is new and deeper in meaning.  A change or gaining of perspective, this can indicate disillusion with the present, inaugurating the growth of greater future contentment and depth.

This card usually carries the meaning of disillusionment and abandonment of things which have not been emotionally fulfilling.

References

Suit of Cups